Warsha is a 2022 French-Lebanese short film directed by Dania Bdeir. The fifteen-minute short stars multidisciplinary performer Khansa, who plays a migrant worker and crane operator in Beirut. After its premiere at Sundance Film Festival, where it won the award for Best Short Film, the film has been presented in numerous international film festivals, including the Clermont-Ferrand Film Festival and  the  Seminci Valladolid Film Festival, where it won the Rainbow for Best Film. The short is now qualified for the 95th Academy Awards under the category of Best Live Action Short Film and is also competing for the 2023 César Awards.

Plot 
In Beirut, a migrant worker volunteers to operate a very dangerous construction crane. Finally alone, he feels free to express his fantasies.

Reception 
Since its launch, the film has been selected in various festivals and academies around the world:

References

External links 
 Warsha at N Arts & Culture
 Trailer Warsha on Vimeo
 Interview Dania Bdeir on Film Fest report
 Warsha on Broadcastpro

2022 films
2022 short films
Lebanese short films
2022 LGBT-related films
LGBT-related short films
Lebanese LGBT-related films
Films about anti-LGBT sentiment
Gay-related films